Juniperus saltuaria is a species of conifer in the family Cupressaceae. It is endemic to southern China and Tibet.

References

saltuaria
Endemic flora of China
Flora of Tibet
Flora of Yunnan
Trees of China
Least concern plants
Taxonomy articles created by Polbot